The 2012 Thailand Open Grand Prix Gold was the fifth grand prix gold and grand prix tournament of the 2012 BWF Grand Prix Gold and Grand Prix. The tournament was held in Nimibutr Stadium, Bangkok, Thailand June 5 until June 10, 2012 and had a total purse of $120,000.

Men's singles

Seeds

  Lin Dan (semi-final)
  Tommy Sugiarto (withdrew)
  Pablo Abian (first round)
  Muhd Hafiz Hashim (withdrew)
  Boonsak Ponsana (third round)
  Kevin Cordon (first round)
  Alamsyah Yunus (third round)
  Chong Wei Feng (second round)
  Brice Leverdez (second round)
  Takuma Ueda (first round)
  Tanongsak Saensomboonsuk (first round)
  Sourabh Varma (quarter-final)
  Dmytro Zavadsky (first round)
  Rajah Menuri Venkata Gurusaidutt (first round)
  Suppanyu Avihingsanon (third round)
  Mohd Arif Abdul Latif (third round)

Finals

Top half

Section 1

Section 2

Section 3

Section 4

Bottom half

Section 5

Section 6

Section 7

Section 8

Women's singles

Seeds

  Saina Nehwal (champion)
  Ratchanok Inthanon (final)
  Porntip Buranaprasertsuk (semi-final)
  Pusarla Venkata Sindhu (second round)
  Carolina Marin (first round)
  Chan Tsz Ka (first round)
  Minatsu Mitani (quarter-final)
  Sapsiree Taerattanachai (quarter-final)

Finals

Top half

Section 1

Section 2

Bottom half

Section 3

Section 4

Men's doubles

Seeds

  Liu Xiaolong / Qiu Zihan (champion)
  Bodin Issara / Maneepong Jongjit (first round)
  Kim Ki-Jung / Kim Sa-Rang (semi-final)
  Markus Fernaldi Gideon / Agripinna Prima Rahmanto Putra (first round)
  Yoshiteru Hirobe / Kenta Kazuno (quarter-final)
  Ricky Karanda Suwardi / Muhammad Ulinnuha (quarter-final)
  Mohd Lutfi Zaim Abdul Khalid / Vountus Indra Mawan (second round)
  Mohd Zakry Abdul Latif / Mohd Fairuzizuan Mohd Tazari (final)

Finals

Top half

Section 1

Section 2

Bottom half

Section 3

Section 4

Women's doubles

Seeds

  Xia Huan / Tang Jinhua (semi-final)
  Shinta Mulia Sari / Yao Lei (second round)
  Vita Marissa / Nadya Melati (quarter-final)
  Chin Eei Hui / Wong Pei Tty (second round)
  Cheng Shu / Pan Pan (final)
  Duanganong Aroonkesorn / Kunchala Voravichitchaikul (semi-final)
  Rie Eto / Yu Wakita (quarter-final)
  Suci Rizki Andini / Della Destiara Haris (quarter-final)

Finals

Top half

Section 1

Section 2

Bottom half

Section 3

Section 4

Mixed doubles

Seeds

  Joachim Fischer Nielsen / Christinna Pedersen (semi-final)
  Sudket Prapakamol / Saralee Thoungthongkam (final)
  Maneepong Jongjit / Savitree Amitrapai (first round)
  Danny Bawa Chrisnanta / Vanessa Neo Yu Yan (semi-final)
  Songphon Anugritayawon / Kunchala Voravichitchaikul (first round)
  Wong Wai Hong / Chau Hoi Wah (second round)
  Irfan Fadhilah / Weni Anggraini (quarter-final)
  Riky Widianto / Richi Puspita Dili (first round)

Finals

Top half

Section 1

Section 2

Bottom half

Section 3

Section 4

References

Thailand Open
Thailand Open Grand Prix Gold
Badminton, Grand Prix Gold, Thailand Open
Badminton, Grand Prix Gold, Thailand Open
Thailand Open (badminton)
Badminton, Grand Prix Gold, Thailand Open